Kaarli may refer to several places in Estonia:
Kaarli, Lääne-Viru County, village in Estonia
Kaarli, Viljandi County, village in Estonia